Paracorixa concinna is a species of water boatman in the family Corixidae. It is found in Europe

It has been reported to be an intermediate host to the tapeworm species Tatria biremis which infects grebes of the genus Podiceps.

References

Corixini
Insects described in 1848